Sayyid Hashem Bathaie Golpayegani (1941 – 16 March 2020) was an Iranian Shia Ayatollah and representative of the Tehran Province in Iran's Assembly of Experts. He studied at the Qom Seminary.

Bathaie ran under the People's Experts and the Friends of Moderation electoral list in the 2016 Iranian Assembly of Experts election.

Golpayegani claimed that "America is the source of coronavirus, because America went head to head with China and realised it cannot keep up with it economically or militarily."

On 22 February, Hashem Bathaie Golpayegani announced at a ceremony that he had been infected with COVID-19, but had healed himself using an "Islamic remedy". Three weeks later, on 14 March, he was hospitalized.  On 15 March 2020, the Al Arabiya English reported that he had been infected with coronavirus. On 16 March, Golpayegani died from the virus.

References

External links 
 
 

Members of the Assembly of Experts
Iranian grand ayatollahs
1941 births
2020 deaths
People from Golpayegan
Deaths from the COVID-19 pandemic in Iran